Eucalyptus conica, commonly known as fuzzy box, is a species of tree endemic to eastern Australia. It has rough, flaky bark on the trunk and larger branches, smooth above, lance-shaped adult leaves, oval to diamond-shaped flower buds mostly arranged on a branching inflorescence on the ends of the branchlets, white flowers and conical fruit.

Description
It has rough, flaky greyish bark with some paler patches, on the trunk and larger branches, smooth whitish bark on the thinner branches. Flowering occurs between July and December and the flowers are white.

Taxonomy and naming
Eucalyptus conica was first formally described in 1900 by Henry Deane and Joseph Maiden and the description was published in Proceedings of the Linnean Society of New South Wales. The specific epithet (conica) is derived from the Latin word conicus meaning "conical" and refers to the shape of the fruit.

Distribution and habitat
Fuzzy box grows on heavier alluvial soils in grassy woodland from near Wagga Wagga to the Northern Tablelands in New South Wales and Carnarvon National Park in Queensland.

References

 A Field Guide to Eucalypts - Brooker & Kleinig volume 1,  page 259

conica
Myrtales of Australia
Flora of New South Wales
Flora of Queensland
Trees of Australia
Plants described in 1900
Taxa named by Joseph Maiden